Nizhnekamenka is a rural locality (a selo) and the administrative center of Nizhnekamensky Selsoviet of Altaysky District, Altai Krai, Russia. The population was 2045 as of 2016. There are 35 streets.

Geography 
Nizhnekamenka is located on the left bank of the Kamenka River, 12 km north of Altayskoye (the district's administrative centre) by road. Altayskoye is the nearest rural locality.

Ethnicity 
The village is inhabited by Russians and others.

References 

Rural localities in Altaysky District, Altai Krai